Sydney Hamilton (1896 - May 31, 1974) was a vaudeville actress.

Biography
She was born in 1896. She married Oliver Morton Trumbull and they had one child, Robert Oliver Trumball who worked as a reporter for the New York Times. She died on May 31, 1974 in Sydney, Australia.

References

1869 births
1974 deaths
20th-century actresses